Sonali Shinal Rao (born 26 October 1997) is a Fijian footballer who plays as a midfielder. She has been a member of the Fiji women's national team.

In August 2018 she was named to the Fijian team for the 2018 OFC Women's Nations Cup.

Notes

References

1997 births
Living people
Women's association football midfielders
Fijian women's footballers
Fiji women's international footballers
Fijian people of Indian descent